Immigrant Nation! The Battle for the Dream is a 2010 feature documentary movie by Esaú Meléndez about the immigrant rights movement from 2006 to 2009 and Elvira Arellano's resistance to deportation. It opened on 2010-03-06 in Washington, DC, at the DC Independent Film Festival. The film includes stories of individuals, organizations, activists and community leaders.  It includes coverage of anti-immigrant activists, but more coverage of those "united by passion and a concern for justice." This film features the opposition to the controversial HR4437 immigration bill, especially the march to Batavia, Illinois, to decry Speaker Dennis Hastert's blockage of comprehensive immigration reform.

Awards

Immigrant Nation! The Battle for the Dream has been nominated at Oaxaca Film Fest.

References

External links 
 

2010 films
Films about the labor movement
Films set in Chicago
Films set in Mexico
American documentary films
Documentary films about American politics
Documentary films about immigration to the United States
Films set in Illinois
2010 documentary films
2010 directorial debut films
2010s English-language films
2010s American films